Jari Johannes Laukkanen (8 June 1962 – 7 October 2019) was a Finnish cross-country skier who competed from 1987 to 1988. He finished eighth in the 4 × 10 km relay at the 1988 Winter Olympics in Calgary. He was born in Viitasaari, Central Finland. Laukkanen died on 7 October 2019 from an unknown illness; he was known to suffer from heart issues.

Laukkanen's best finish at the FIS Nordic World Ski Championships was ninth in the 15 km event at Oberstdorf in 1987. His best World Cup finish was sixth in a 15 km event in Canada in 1987.

Cross-country skiing results
All results are sourced from the International Ski Federation (FIS).

Olympic Games

World Championships

World Cup

Season standings

Team podiums
 1 podium

References

External links

Olympic 4 × 10 km relay results: 1936-2002 

1962 births
2019 deaths
People from Viitasaari
Cross-country skiers at the 1988 Winter Olympics
Finnish male cross-country skiers
Olympic cross-country skiers of Finland
Sportspeople from Central Finland
20th-century Finnish people